Kələk (also Kelek and Kyalyak) is a village and municipality in the Goranboy Rayon of Azerbaijan.  It has a population of 714.

References 

Populated places in Goranboy District